is a former Japanese football player.

Playing career
Urakami was born in Kunitachi on 7 February 1969. After graduating from high school, he joined Nissan Motors (later Yokohama Marinos) in 1988. Through reserve team, he joined top team in 1990. However he could hardly play in the match behind Japan national team player Shigetatsu Matsunaga. In 1995, he moved to Shimizu S-Pulse. However he could hardly play in the match behind Masanori Sanada. In 1997, he moved to Japan Football League club Kawasaki Frontale. He became a regular player and the club was promoted to J2 League in 1999 and J1 League in 2000. The club was relegated to J2 in 2001. He lost his regular position behind Shinya Yoshihara from 2003 and he retired end of 2004 season.

Club statistics

References

External links

orions.ne.jp

1969 births
Living people
Association football people from Tokyo Metropolis
People from Kunitachi, Tokyo
Japanese footballers
Japan Soccer League players
J1 League players
J2 League players
Japan Football League (1992–1998) players
Yokohama F. Marinos players
Shimizu S-Pulse players
Kawasaki Frontale players
Association football goalkeepers